The 2012–13 Premier Soccer League season (known as the ABSA Premiership for sponsorship reasons) saw the introduction of the Q-innovation system. The league schedule is split into four fixture-blocks referred to as quarters, the first and third blocks have eight fixtures, the second and fourth blocks have seven fixtures. 

Prize money is given to the teams who finish top of the table after each block of fixtures.

2012-13 Q3 League table

References

Premier Soccer League